The Global Greens (GG) is an international network of political parties and movements which work to implement the Global Greens Charter. It consists of various national green political parties, partner networks, and other organizations associated with green politics.

Formed in 2001 at the First Global Greens Congress, the network has grown to include 76 full member parties and 11 observers and associate parties as of May 2022, so a total of 87 members. It is governed by a 12-member steering committee called the Global Greens Coordination, and each member party falls under the umbrella of one of four affiliated regional green federations. The day-to-day operations of the Global Greens are managed by the Secretariat, led by Global Greens Convenors Bob Hale and Gloria Polanco since 2020.

History
The world's first green parties were founded in 1972. These were in the Australian state of Tasmania (the United Tasmania Group) and in New Zealand (the Values Party). Others followed quickly: in 1973, PEOPLE (later the Ecology Party) was set up in the UK, and in other European countries Green and radical parties sprang up in the following years.

Petra Kelly, a German ecofeminist activist, is often cited as one of the first thinkers and leaders of the green politics movement. Her work in founding the German Green Party in West Germany in 1980 was instrumental in bringing prominence to green political parties on both the national and international stages.

The first Planetary Meeting of the Greens was held in Rio de Janeiro on May 30–31, 1992 in conjunction with the Rio Earth Summit being concurrently held in Brazil. It was here that the first ever Global Greens statement was issued, beginning with this preface:

"Experience teaches us that governments are only moved to take environmental problems seriously when people vote for environmental political parties."

The first Global Greens Congress was held in Canberra, Australia, in 2001. The official Global Greens Charter was issued here, and the Congress delegates set up the framework and organizational structures that would build the Global Greens into an ongoing international network and movement, including the Global Greens Coordination. In 2010, the first Global Greens Secretary was appointed.

Global Greens Charter
The Global Greens Charter is the guiding document that establishes the principles and "core values" to which member parties and associated organizations should attempt to adhere. It sets out global principles that cross boundaries to bind Greens from around the world together:
Participatory Democracy
Nonviolence
Social Justice
Sustainability
Respect for Diversity
Ecological Wisdom

Priorities outlined in the Charter include reforming the dominant economic model, tackling climate change, ending the hunger crisis, promoting vibrant democracy, working for peace, protecting biodiversity.

The Global Greens Charter has been reviewed and updated twice during Global Greens Congresses since its original publishing in 2001: once in Dakar, Senegal in 2012, and again in Liverpool, UK, in 2017. The updated 2017 version is offered in English, and past versions can be accessed in 11 various languages.

Regional Federations of the Global Greens
The Global Greens are organized into four regional federations across the world:
Asia Pacific Greens Federation
European Green Party
Federation of Green Parties of Africa
Federation of the Green Parties of the Americas

Global Greens Coordination
The Global Greens has a 12-member steering committee called the Global Greens Coordination. The makeup of this committee stems from three elected members from each of the four regional federations, supported by three alternates who can stand in when needed.

Global Greens Congress
The Global Greens have held four Congresses since 2001 in various locations around the world:
2001 - Canberra, Australia
2008 - São Paulo, Brazil
2012 - Dakar, Senegal
2017 - Liverpool, UK

The Global Greens strives to achieve regional diversity and representation, encouraging Congress locations to represent the wide geographical spread of the organization's member parties and organizations. The next Global Greens Congress will be held in 2023. It will be hosted by the Green Party Korea in Seoul.

Networks

The Global Greens have five networks designed to enable global collaboration, communication and community among member parties and organizations:
Friends of Global Greens 
This network is composed of Green parties, parliamentarians and activists who make recurring donations of any amount to the Global Greens.
Global Greens LGBT+ Network
This network aims to:
"Support LGBT+ groups within Green Parties around the world to work together and support each other;
Support Green Parties looking to set up LGBT+ groups, and;
Promote LGBT+ equality as outlined in the Global Greens Charter."
Global Greens Parliamentarians Network
This network is composed of Green Members of Parliament from Global Greens member parties and works to fulfil the following objectives:
"To be active, in a coordinated manner, in our parliaments on issues of identified global concern, in order to influence the governments of our countries, and the public whom we represent, to the goals specifically identified by the Global Greens;
To develop a mutually-reinforcing and mutually-supportive network of MPs, as individuals, to help us each to become most effective in our parliamentary action, and realise our potential as movers of positive global change, and;
To achieve positive change for Green goals at the global and regional levels through the strengthening of international institutions, including more parliamentarian representation and decision-making influence in those bodies."
Global Greens Women's Network
This network supports the participation of Green women worldwide in democratic political processes, by focusing on: 
"Capacity building and empowerment: training and developing skills, such as public speaking and leadership;
Governance and participation: confronting inequalities at the organizational level and exchanging best practices to tackle them and promote participation;
Campaigning about major topics relevant to women: such as gender justice and climate change, and;
Carrying out formal functions as part of global Greens governance: e.g. nominating women to the Asia-Pacific Greens Federation (APGF) Council."
Global Young Greens
This network is a "youth-led organization supporting and uniting the efforts of young people from a green-alternative spectrum around the world. It works towards (1) ecological sustainability, (2) social justice, (3) grassroots democracy and (4) peace."

Global Greens Ambassadors
The Global Greens Coordination appointed Christine Milne AO as the first Global Greens Ambassador in 2015. Milne was appointed as Global Greens Ambassador in recognition of her considerable expertise in climate change and as an elected member of state and federal parliaments, including as Leader of the Australian Greens.

Member parties

Member parties in the Americas

Affiliated members in North, Central and South America form the Federation of the Green Parties of the Americas.

Member parties in Asia and Oceania

Affiliated members in Asia, Pacific and Oceania form the Asia Pacific Greens Federation.

Member parties in Africa

Affiliated parties in Africa form the Federation of Green Parties of Africa.

Member parties in Europe
Affiliated members in Europe form the European Green Party.

Observers and associate member parties

See also
Biodiversity
Climate change
Conservation movement
Direct democracy
Earth science
Ecology
Ecosystem
Environmental movement
Grassroots democracy
List of environmental organizations
Natural environment
Nature
Nature conservation
Participatory democracy
Sustainability

References

External links

 
Left-wing internationals
Green political parties
Political internationals
Global policy organizations
Organizations established in 2001